The 1944 football season was São Paulo's 15th season since the club's founding in 1930.

Overall

{|class="wikitable"
|-
|Games played || 39 (20 Campeonato Paulista, 19 Friendly match)
|-
|Games won ||  25 (13 Campeonato Paulista, 12 Friendly match)
|-
|Games drawn || 7 (3 Campeonato Paulista, 4 Friendly match)
|-
|Games lost || 7 (4 Campeonato Paulista, 3 Friendly match)
|-
|Goals scored || 116
|-
|Goals conceded || 62
|-
|Goal difference || +54
|-
|Best result || 9–1 (H) v Santos - Campeonato Paulista - 1944.06.18
|-
|Worst result || 0–5 (A) v Peñarol - Friendly match - 1944.12.24
|-
|Most appearances || 
|-
|Top scorer || 
|-

Friendlies

Official competitions

Campeonato Paulista

Record

External links
official website 

Association football clubs 1944 season
1944
1944 in Brazilian football